Free Realms was a massively multiplayer online (MMO) role playing video game developed by Sony Online Entertainment (SOE) for Microsoft Windows, Mac and PlayStation 3 that is set in a fantasy-themed world named Sacred Grove. The game was released on April 28, 2009, for Windows. The game restricted to free-to-play up to level 4, although there was access to additional game content via a membership fee. The game allowed the player to fight, interact with other players and more. The game was shut down on March 31, 2014; SOE stated that it did not have the resources to keep the game going.

Business model 
The game was available to download and play free of charge. The PC version was accessed via the Free Realms web site or, through game arcade sites Candy Stand or Miniclip. During character creation a 3D client downloaded in the background and then streamed as the user played; the same method was used to download new content or updates, which reduced file size and download times. A version of Free Realms for Mac was announced at SOE Fan Faire 2010 for release "within the next 3 months." The Mac version was released on November 2, 2010.

The PlayStation 3 version was released on March 31, 2011, on the US PlayStation Store and on September 11, 2011, in the EU and was accessible via the PlayStation Network.

Free Realms offered an optional membership for a single player, which allowed for 3 characters to be created per account (plus other benefits such as member-only quests, jobs and items). Only one character can be played at a time; the game will kick extra active characters. Before Free Realms was shut down, SOE planned to offer a "family" membership that would allow multiple logins at the same time. Separate to memberships is the Station Cash currency which can be used for premium features across Sony Online Entertainment games (including Free Realms).

It had a very similar gameplay style to World of Warcraft but was more family-friendly. They also allowed your character to be many different things and it did not have to be human. Depending on what your charter was it could have abilities (i.e., if you had a fairy for your character it could fly, etc.). This website was most known for its quests but it also had areas where people could just hang out and get to know each other!

Reception 

In The New York Times, Free Realms was well received. Reviewer Seth Shiesel noted, "For Sony Online, Free Realms is a triumph of the company's own reinvention." USA Today reviewer Marc Saltzman gave Free Realms a 4/5 score, noting "Sony Online Entertainment's Free Realms is an extraordinary online adventure that is sure to please tweens and teens looking for a fun and free fantasy world." Eurogamer gave the game a largely positive review, MMO editor Oli Welsh describing the game as "an effortlessly light and addictive indulgence". MMOHuts gave the game a 4/5 and noted that "Free Realms is one of the most feature-rich free MMORPGs currently available and it's all delivered in a beautiful package". In a review of Free Realms at USA Network's Character Arcade, David Chapman stated that the game "is a surprisingly deep game experience for a free to play model. There's never a shortage of things to do ... even if you never pay a dime to Sony."

John Smedley, president of Sony Online Entertainment, revealed that one million users had signed up to Free Realms 18 days after its launch; a month after release Free Realms reached two million users, and registrations have continued growing at a steady rate since then. As of July 24, 2009, it had nearly five million registered users. Sony Online Entertainment announced in February 2010 that the game had eight million registered users. In April 2010, it was announced that the game had ten million players, with two million players signing up in March 2010.

Comic 
A Free Realms tie-in comic, published by DC Comics' Wildstorms and released for $4.99 per issue, held twelve issues each of which contained a unique one time code redeemable for an in game virtual reward. The comic was written by J.S. Lewis, writer of the "Gray Griffon" series of young-adult fantasy books, with art by Allen Martinez and Jon Buran.

The comic featured Dane Kensington, an aspiring Brawler who set out on his adventure in hopes of becoming stronger.

References

External links 
 

Massively multiplayer online role-playing games
2009 video games
Products and services discontinued in 2014
Fantasy massively multiplayer online role-playing games
Free-to-play video games
Inactive massively multiplayer online games
Digital collectible card games
MacOS games
PlayStation 3 games
PlayStation Network games
Video games adapted into comics
Video games developed in the United States
Windows games